Ana del Rey (born 6 April 1985), also known as Anita del Rey, is a Spanish television, film, and stage actress known for her roles in La pecera de Eva, El tiempo entre costuras, Muñecas, and Acacias 38.

Biography 
Del Rey was born in Alicante, Valencia, Spain. She worked in productions of the musical Hoy No Me Puedo Levantar, and had minor roles in the TV series' Un paso adelante, Arrayán, and  before landing the role as Olivia Gómez in La pecera de Eva. Since 2015, Del Rey has played one of the main characters, Trini Crespo, in the long-running Spanish TV drama Acacias 38, which attracts over 1 million viewers.

Del Rey has appeared on stage in Nacho López' comedy Elige tu propio bankero alongside  and Wanda Obreke.

Filmography 
 Un paso adelante (2003, TV series)
 Arrayán (2009, TV series)
  (2009, TV series)
 La pecera de Eva (2010–11, TV series)
 Rotos (2012, short)
 The Time in Between (2013–14, El tiempo entre costuras)
 Sue (2015, short)
 Ánima (2015, TV series short)
 Executive (2015, short)
 Fuera de foco (2015)
 Acacias 38 (2015–19, TV series)
 Muñecas (2016, TV series short)
  (2016, TV special)

References

External links 

Living people
21st-century Spanish actresses
Spanish film actresses
People from Alicante
1985 births